Jiang Binbin (born 31 May 1996) is a Chinese badminton player.

Achievements

BWF World Junior Championships 
Girls' doubles

Asian Junior Championships 
Girls' doubles

BWF International Challenge/Series 
Women's doubles

  BWF International Challenge tournament
  BWF International Series tournament
  BWF Future Series tournament

References

External links 
 

Living people
1996 births
Badminton players from Zhejiang
Chinese female badminton players
21st-century Chinese women